Luke Bailey may refer to:

Luke Bailey (actor) (born 1984), British actor
Luke Bailey (rugby league) (born 1980), Australian rugby league international player
Luke Bailey (wheelchair racer) (born 1997), Australian Paralympian